USOA or USoA may also refer to:

 United States of America, a country in North America
 Underwater Society of America, the peak body for underwater sport and recreational diving in the United States
 United States Othello Association, a nonprofit corporation dedicated to the advancement of the game of Othello in the United States 
 The United States of America (band), a late-1960s American experimental rock and psychedelic band
 The United States of America (album), the band's eponymous 1968 album